Joonas Korpisalo (born 28 April 1994) is a Finnish professional ice hockey goaltender for the  Los Angeles Kings of the National Hockey League (NHL).

Playing career

Korpisalo played professionally in his native Finland in the SM-liiga during the 2012–13 and 2013–14 seasons for Jokerit and Ilves respectively.

Columbus Blue Jackets (2014–2023)
Korpisalo was selected by the Columbus Blue Jackets in the third round (62nd overall) of the 2012 NHL Entry Draft. On 21 March 2014, the Blue Jackets signed Korpisalo to a three-year, entry-level contract.

During the latter half of the 2016–17 NHL season, Korpisalo took over as the Blue Jackets's backup goaltender behind Sergei Bobrovsky. On 9 June 2017, the Blue Jackets signed Korpisalo to a two-year contract extension. When Bobrovsky left to join the Florida Panthers in free agency before the 2019–20 season, Korpisalo became the Blue Jackets' starting goaltender. However, after injuring his knee in a shootout loss to the Chicago Blackhawks on 29 December, rookie goaltender Elvis Merzļikins had to start in his absence.

On 17 April 2020, Korpisalo signed a two-year contract extension worth $5.6 million to stay with the Blue Jackets.

Korpisalo hung onto the starting job for the 2020 Stanley Cup playoffs, and made his NHL playoff debut for the Blue Jackets on 2 August 2020. Korpisalo did not allow a goal against the Toronto Maple Leafs in a 2–0 victory, becoming the first Blue Jackets goaltender to record a shutout in the playoffs. On 9 August 2020, Korpisalo would again shutout the Maple Leafs by a 3–0 score, eliminating them from the playoffs and securing a series win for the Blue Jackets.  In Game 1 of the Blue Jackets' First Round series, Korpisalo would set a new modern NHL record for saves made in a single game with 85, despite a 3–2 defeat in quintuple overtime versus the Tampa Bay Lightning. His performance surpassed the previous modern record of 73, set by Kelly Hrudey in the Easter Epic 33 years prior, and was ultimately eight short of the all-time record of 92 set by Detroit Red Wings goaltender Normie Smith in the 1936 NHL playoffs.

Los Angeles Kings (2023–present)
On 1 March 2023, Korpisalo was traded alongside Vladislav Gavrikov to the Los Angeles Kings, in exchange for Jonathan Quick, a conditional first-round pick in 2023, and a third-round pick in 2024.

Personal life
Joonas is the son of former Liiga forward Jari Korpisalo.

Career statistics

Regular season and playoffs

International

Awards and honors

References

External links
 

1994 births
Cleveland Monsters players
Columbus Blue Jackets draft picks
Columbus Blue Jackets players
Finnish expatriate ice hockey players in the United States
Finnish ice hockey goaltenders
Ilves players
Jokerit players
Kiekko-Vantaa players
Lake Erie Monsters players
Lempäälän Kisa players
Living people
Los Angeles Kings players
Sportspeople from Pori
Springfield Falcons players